Mukim Ukong is a mukim in Tutong District, Brunei. The population was 2,272 in 2016.

Name 
The mukim is named after Kampong Ukong, one of the villages it encompasses.

Geography 
The mukim is located in the south-west of Tutong District, bordering Mukim Tanjong Maya to the north-east, Mukim Lamunin to the east, Mukim Rambai to the south-east, Mukim Bukit Sawat in Belait District to the south-west and Mukim Telisai to the north-west.

Demographics 
As of 2016 census, the population was 2,272 with  males and  females. The mukim had 422 households occupying 412 dwellings. The entire population lived in rural areas.

Villages 
Mukim Ukong includes the following populated villages:

References 

Ukong
Tutong District